Kevin O'Connor (born January 1, 1968) is an American television personality. He has been the host of the PBS home renovation series This Old House since replacing Steve Thomas in 2003.

Early life and education 
O'Connor and his four brothers and two sisters grew up on various job sites led by his father, a civil engineer. He grew up in Maplewood, New Jersey.

After graduating in 1986 from Saint Benedict's Preparatory School in Newark, New Jersey, O'Connor received a Bachelor of Arts degree in history from the College of the Holy Cross in 1990. He earned a Master's degree in Business Administration from Boston University in 1999.

Career 
O'Connor worked for Fleet Bank as a Vice President in the Sports Finance Group, then worked for Bank of America as a Senior Vice President in the Commercial Real Estate Group.

The producers of This Old House approached him to become their new host following the departure of Steve Thomas. O'Connor and his wife, Kathleen, appeared on an episode of Ask This Old House (Season 1, Episode 22), in which painting contractor Jim Clark assisted them with a wallpaper-removal project. O'Connor made his hosting debut on This Old House in Season 25, Episode 1.

O'Connor, also the host of Ask This Old House and Inside This Old House, holds a position on the editorial board of the This Old House magazine, published by This Old House Ventures, Inc.

In September 2011, O'Connor debuted as the author of his first book The Best Homes from This Old House.

Personal life 
O'Connor lives with his wife and their three children in an 1894 Queen Anne Victorian home in Hamilton, Massachusetts.

References

External links 
 
 Charles and Hudson interview with Kevin O'Connor

1968 births
American television hosts
Boston University School of Management alumni
College of the Holy Cross alumni
Living people
PBS people
People from Hamilton, Massachusetts
People from Maplewood, New Jersey
St. Benedict's Preparatory School alumni
This Old House